2-Undecanone, also known as methyl nonyl ketone and IBI-246, is the organic compound with the formula CH3C(O)C9H19.  It a colorless oil.  It is usually produced synthetically, but it can also be extracted from various plant sources, including from essential oil of rue. It is found naturally in bananas, cloves, ginger, guava, strawberries, wild-grown tomatoes, and the perennial leaf vegetable Houttuynia cordata.

Uses
Because of its strong odor it is primarily used as an insect repellent or animal repellent. Typically, 1–2% concentrations of 2-undecanone are found in dog and cat repellents in the form of a liquid, aerosol spray, or gel.  2-Undecanone is also used in the perfumery and flavoring industries. 

It has been investigated as a mosquito repellant, like DEET.

Chemical properties
2-Undecanone is a ketone that  is soluble in organic solvents but insoluble in water. Like most methyl ketones, 2-undecanone undergoes a haloform reaction when in the presence of a basic solution of hypochlorite. For example, the reaction between 2-undecanone and sodium hypochlorite yields sodium decanoate, chloroform, and sodium hydroxide.

CH3CO(CH2)8CH3 + 3 NaOCl → CH3(CH2)8COONa + CHCl3 + 2 NaOH

See also 
 Perfume allergy

Notes

References 
 Lange's Handbook of Chemistry (14th Edition), McGraw-Hill, 1992; Section 1; Table 1.15
 The Condensed Chemical Dictionary (10th Edition), Gesner G. Hawley
 2-Undecanone from The Good Scents Company
 MSDS for 2-Undecanone

Alkanones
Insect repellents